Scrinium furtivum is a species of sea snail, a marine gastropod mollusk in the family Mitromorphidae.

Description
The length of the shell attains 7.5 mm, its diameter 3 mm.

(Original description) The small, very solid shell is ovate-oblong and rounded at either end. It contains six whorls, two forming the low protoconch, convex, a little constricted below the suture, which is deeply impressed. It s colour is vinaceous-buff, sometimes with a white zone its own breadth below the suture, and half-a-dozen evenly spaced narrow white lines on the remainder of the whorl. The colour of the columella is terra-cotta, and the aperture orange-cinnamon with a buff zone.

Sculpture: in general the shell is smooth. On the upper whorls about ten low nodular ribs are scarcely distinguishable The lines of growth are marked by numerous irregular scratches. A few evanescent spiral grooves may or may not appear on the body whorl. The aperture is wide and smooth within. The outer lip is simple. The sinus is represented by an arch of the summit. The inner lip a thin callus, which at the basal axis meets at an acute angle a thicker callus rising to form a reflected border to the short and very broad siphonal canal. The columella is vertical, flattened, and a little twisted.

Distribution
This marine species is endemic to Australia and occurs off New South Wales and Victoria

References

 Laseron, C. 1954. Revision of the New South Wales Turridae (Mollusca). Australian Zoological Handbook. Sydney : Royal Zoological Society of New South Wales pp. 56, pls 1–12.
 Powell, A.W.B. 1966. The molluscan families Speightiidae and Turridae, an evaluation of the valid taxa, both Recent and fossil, with list of characteristic species. Bulletin of the Auckland Institute and Museum. Auckland, New Zealand 5: 1–184, pls 1–23
 

furtivum
Gastropods described in 1922
Gastropods of Australia